William "Bill" Kidd is an American musician, conductor, composer, and orchestrator. He has worked on many television shows and feature films, including Lois & Clark: The New Adventures of Superman, Left Behind, Muhammad: The Last Prophet and Return to Lonesome Dove.

Kidd's work is also featured on the official soundtrack album of the theme park Islands of Adventure.

External links

American male composers
21st-century American composers
Living people
21st-century American male musicians
Year of birth missing (living people)